Maintained by the Kentucky Department of Parks, Kentucky's system of 49 state parks has been referred to as "the nation's finest" and experiences more repeat business annually than those of any other U.S. state. The state's diverse geography provides a variety of environments to experience. From mountain lakes to expansive caves to forests teeming with wildlife, park-goers have their choice of attractions, and they are all within a day's drive of each other.

Unless otherwise specified, data in the following lists are taken from Kentucky State Parks by Bill Bailey.

Although the Kentucky Horse Park is owned by the Commonwealth of Kentucky, it is administered separately from the Department of Parks.  Breaks Interstate Park is also separate, administered under an interstate compact with the state of Virginia, in partnership with the parks departments of both states.

State recreational parks
Kentucky's 24 "rec parks" span the state from Columbus to Pikeville. Each features outdoor camping areas with a variety of outdoor activities.

State resort parks
Kentucky offers more state resort parks than any other state. Each features a lodge complete with dining room and Wi-Fi wireless Internet access.

State historic sites
Ten of Kentucky's recreational parks and two of its resort parks are simultaneously designated as state historic sites. An additional eleven state historic sites are also maintained by the Kentucky Department of Parks.

See also
List of Kentucky state forests
List of U.S. national parks

References

External links
 Kentucky Department of Parks

 
Kentucky state parks